Father's Day is a secular holiday celebrating fatherhood.

Father's Day may also refer to:

Celebrations 
Father's Day (United States), the holiday as observed in the US
Saint Joseph's Day, a Catholic feast day observed as Father's Day in some countries

Film
Father's Day (1930 film), or The Sins of the Children, an American film by Sam Wood
Father's Day (1955 film), a West German comedy film directed by Hans Richter
Father's Day (1996 film), a German comedy by Sherry Hormann
Fathers' Day (1997 film), an American comedy by Ivan Reitman
Father's Day (2011 film), an American-Canadian action-horror comedy film
Father's Day (2012 film), an Indian Malayalam-language film
"Father's Day" (Creepshow), a story segment of the 1982 film Creepshow

Literature 
Father's Day (novel), a 1971 novel by William Goldman
Father's Day, a 1981 novel by Eugene Kennedy
"Father's Day", a 1985 story in the 2006 comics collection DC Universe: The Stories of Alan Moore

Music 
Father's Day (album), by Father MC, or the title song, 1990
"Father's Day", a song by Gucci Mane from Evil Genius, 2018

Television episodes 
"Father's Day" (The Cosby Show), 1984
"Father's Day" (Cyberchase), 2009
"Father's Day" (Doctor Who), 2005
"Father's Day" (Forever Knight), 1994
"Father's Day" (The Jeffersons), 1983
"Father's Day" (Jem), 1987
"Father's Day" (Oh, Doctor Beeching!), 1997
"Father's Day" (Phineas and Ferb), 2014
"Father's Day" (Roseanne), 1989
"Father's Day" (RoboCop: Alpha Commando), 1998
"Father's Day" (Scorpion), 2014
"Father's Day" (Shameless), 2012
"Father's Day" (Superman: The Animated Series), 1997

Theatre
 Father's Day (play), a dark comedy by Oliver Hailey

See also
Father's Day Bank Massacre
2010 Billings tornado, also known as the Father's Day Tornado
Les Compères, a 1983 French film remade as the 1997 film Father's Day
Stepfather III, or Stepfather III: Father's Day in home video releases
"Not a Father's Day", an episode of How I Met Your Mother
Parents' Day, a holiday combining Father's Day and Mother's Day
Mother's Day (disambiguation)